Mark Twain/I-70 Industrial is a neighborhood of St. Louis, Missouri.  It is bound by I-70 to the north, North Kingshighway to the east, Natural Bridge Road to the south, and the city limit to the west.

Demographics

In 2020 Mark Twain/I-70 Industrial's racial makeup was 92.5% Black, 3.7% White, 0.2% Asian, 0.1% American Indian, 3.0% Two or More Races, and 0.6% Some Other Race. 1.3% of the population was of Hispanic or Latino origin.

References

Neighborhoods in St. Louis